A toolkit is an assembly of tools; set of basic building units for user interfaces.

The word toolkit may refer to:
 Abstract Window Toolkit
 Accessibility Toolkit
 Adventure Game Toolkit
 B-Toolkit
 Battlefield Mod Development Toolkit
 Cheminformatics toolkits
 Dojo Toolkit
 Fox toolkit
 Globus Toolkit
 GTK, the GIMP Toolkit
 Google Web Toolkit (GWT)
 Harmony (toolkit), an incomplete set of software widgets
 Helsinki Finite-State Technology (HFST)
 Insight Segmentation and Registration Toolkit
 IT Mill Toolkit
 Learnosity Toolkit
 Molecular Modelling Toolkit
 Multidimensional hierarchical toolkit
 Sun Java Wireless Toolkit
 OCR SDK, OCR Toolkit
 OpenGL Utility Toolkit (GLUT)
 Open Inventor 3D graphics API
 Qt
 Motif
 Natural Language Toolkit
 Portable, Extensible Toolkit for Scientific Computation
 Scedu Tender Readiness Toolkit
 Sprite Animation Toolkit
 Standard Widget Toolkit (SWT)
 Synthesis Toolkit
 Template Toolkit
 The Coroner's Toolkit, computer programs for digital forensic analysis
 User Interface Toolkit (UIM)
 X Toolkit Intrinsics

See also
 
 Widget toolkit
 List of widget toolkits